Speed to Spare is a 1948 American drama film directed by William Berke, written by Milton Raison, and starring Richard Arlen, Jean Rogers, Richard Travis, Roscoe Karns, Nanette Parks and Pat Phelan. It was released on May 14, 1948, by Paramount Pictures. It is unrelated to the same-titled auto-racing drama made by Columbia in 1937.

Premise 
Cliff Jordan, a stunt driver, accepts a job driving trucks for Jerry McGee, who is now married to Cliff's former love Mary. A rival, Pusher Wilkes, begins sabotaging Jerry's big rigs, placing Cliff in grave danger on the highway.

Cast 
Richard Arlen as Cliff Jordan
Jean Rogers as Mary McGee
Richard Travis as Jerry McGee
Roscoe Karns as Kangaroo
Nanette Parks as Jane Chandler
Pat Phelan as Pete Simmons
Ian MacDonald as Pusher Wilkes
Paul Harvey as Al Simmons

Production
The film was known as High Speed.

References

External links 
 

1948 films
1940s English-language films
Paramount Pictures films
American auto racing films
American drama films
1948 drama films
Films directed by William A. Berke
Trucker films
American black-and-white films
1940s American films